Ken Klein can refer to:

 Ken Klein Sr. (born 1936), sailor for the United States Virgin Islands
 Ken Klein Jr. (born 1959), windsurfer for the United States Virgin Islands